Bennet may refer to:

Arts, entertainment and media
 Bennet (band), a 1990s British band 
 Bennet and the Band, an Indian backing band
 Bennet–Veetraag, an Indian music director duo
 Bennet family, fictional characters from  Pride and Prejudice
 Noah Bennet, a fictional character from TV drama Heroes

Other uses
 Bennet (surname), including a list of people with the name
 Bennet, Nebraska, a place in the U.S.
 Bennet (supermarket), in Italy
 Geum urbanum, or herb Bennet, a perennial plant

See also

 Benet (disambiguation)
 Bennett (disambiguation)
 Benett, a surname